The Red Color (transl.: Tzeva Adom) is an early-warning radar system installed by the Israel Defense Forces in several towns surrounding the Gaza Strip to warn civilians of imminent attack by rockets (usually Qassam rockets). Outside of areas serviced by the Red Color system, standard air raid sirens are used to warn of rocket attacks.

The system currently operates in settlements around Gaza envelope and in Sderot. When the signature of a rocket launch is detected originating in Gaza, the system automatically activates the public broadcast warning system in nearby Israeli communities and military bases. A recorded female voice, intoning the Hebrew words for Red Color ("Tzeva Adom"), is broadcast 4 times. The entire program is repeated until all rockets have impacted and no further launches are detected. 

The system was installed in Ashkelon between July 2005 and April 2006.

Up to 2007, the announcement was called Red Dawn (transl.: Shakhar Adom) but it was changed to the Hebrew words for Red Color (transl.: Tzeva Adom) due to a complaint made by a 7-year-old girl named Shakhar (Hebrew for dawn).

It was the subject of a documentary, which focused on how children are to cope with an alert, directed by Yoav Shoam.

Since 2014, alerts have been available on an iPhone application from the App Store. It was the most downloaded app in Israel in July 2014 during Operation Protective Edge. Users can select to receive alerts for rocket attacks nationwide, or only in their districts.

See also
 Counter-battery radar
 List of Qassam Rocket Attacks
 Iron Dome – an Israeli air defense system for short-range projectiles

References

Ground radars
Military radars of Israel
Second Intifada
Civil defense
Emergency management in Israel
Israel Defense Forces
Gaza–Israel conflict
Warning systems
Ashkelon
Military equipment introduced in the 2000s